Hrvace is a municipality in Croatia in the Split-Dalmatia County. It has a population of 3,617 (2011 census), 98% of which are Croats. The mayor's name is Dinko Bošnjak. Settlements in the municipality are Dabar, Donji Bitelić, Gornji Bitelić, Hrvace, Laktac, Maljkovo, Potravlje, Rumin, Satrić, Vučipolje and Zasiok.

Geography 
The village sits on the D1 road between Sinj and Vrlika on the edge of the small karst field and under Svilaja mountain. The municipality has a lot of natural sites such as the Peruća Lake, Miloš Lake, Orlove Stine (Eagle's Cliffs) and the Cetina river.

History 
The name Hrvace comes from the verb "Hrvati" (Croats). The time of the village's first inhabitants is unknown.

Hrvace area was a battleground during the Croatian War of Independence in 1991 and 1992. Every village of the municipality took heavy Serb damage, forcing the large part of the population to move out. The most notable battle includes the one for Peruća dam, where the Serbian Army's goal was mining it, eventually flooding the large part of the Sinj karst field and field-side villages and towns. In 1993, Croatian Army took back the dam, threw out the Serbian Army and prevented heavy damage.

Economy 
The food (meat) industry, stone excavation industry and the Peruća power plant are the major economical activities in the municipality.

Sports 
NK Hrvace, Third Division South, 3.HNL South champions in 2007/08

Paragliding klub Hrvace

Education 
Osnovna škola Dinka Šimunovića (Dinko Šimunović elementary school)

References

Populated places in Split-Dalmatia County
Municipalities of Croatia